The United States vs. Billie Holiday (Music from the Motion Picture) is the soundtrack album to the 2021 film of the same name, released on February 19, 2021 by Warner Records. The film is based on the life of singer Billie Holiday, and also from the book Chasing the Scream: The First and Last Days of the War on Drugs by Johann Hari. Directed by Lee Daniels, it features Andra Day performing the titular character. The soundtrack featured several compilation of songs composed and performed by Day. She also wrote the original song "Tigress & Tweed" and had co-produced the album with Salaam Remi, and Raphael Saadiq and Warren Felder. Lynn Fainchtein and Daniels were the music supervisors.

The 13-song soundtrack album is composed mostly of western, contemporary classical, pop and soul music originated from the 1930s and late-1950s, reflecting on Billie Holiday's time period. It was recorded mostly live on sets and were conceptualised in late-September 2019, even before the film's shooting began, the following month. The soundtrack won the Grammy Award for Best Compilation Soundtrack for Visual Media at the 64th Grammy Awards, with the track "Tigress & Tweed" being nominated for Best Original Songs at the Golden Globe and Black Reel award ceremonies in 2021.

The original score is composed by Kris Bowers. Bowers' score was released into a separate 12-track album titled The United States vs. Billie Holiday (Original Motion Picture Score) on February 26, 2021 by Lakeshore Records, which coincided with the film's streaming release on Hulu.

Background 
The songs were recorded live on sets, and mostly used period instruments from 1930s and 1950s to capture the essence of contemporary classical music. Salaam Remi co-produced the original songs with Day, with the film's director Lee Daniels and Lynn Fainchtein jointly supervised the music. Remi and Fainchtein, in an interview to Variety, had spoken about the production of the compiled tracks. For Remi, "it was an understanding of what the original arrangements were, and how they would have done them at that time, but also how they were playing out in the movie". Both wanted the music to be as authentic to the time period, though the layers of the music and the orchestration, are more like the pop of the '70s than the jazz of the '40s or '50s. Remi stated that "On a lot of Billie Holiday recordings, you can't always hear [the detail]. There might have been one mic going straight to vinyl. I had to augment because I was recording digital at the highest possible bit rate." All the tracks were composed prior to the film's shooting, in Miami, in September 2019. Day, had sung for most of the tracks in the film, whom Remi had claimed that she "had the vocal chops and was nailing it from the beginning". 

Mark Isham, Craig Harris and Christopher Gunning were previously announced to compose for the score, until Kris Bowers, was approached by the makers and recording for the background score were completed by late-December 2020.

Release 
Prior to the soundtrack release, Day's cover versions of "All of Me" and "Strange Fruit" were released as digital singles on January 13 and 21, 2021, respectively. The original song "Tigress & Tweed" was released as the third track from the album on January 27. Day co-wrote the song with Raphael Saadiq, who also composed and produced the track. The track list for Music from the Motion Picture was first released on February 1, with pre-orders beginning on the same date through the Amazon.com website. Warner Records released the soundtrack digitally on February 19, followed by a physical release on March 19, and a vinyl edition being released on July 23. Original Motion Picture Score, which contains Kris Bowers' compositions for the film score was released on February 26, coinciding with the streaming release on Hulu.

Track listing

Chart performance

Release history

Personnel 
Credits adapted from Allmusic.

Instruments 

 Strings – Stephen Coleman (arrangements), Dan Higgins (arrangements)
 Bass – Salaam Remi, Raphael Saadiq
 Drums – Salaam Remi, TFOX
 Guitar – Vincent Henry, Charlie Hunter
 Horns – Vincent Henry (arrangements)
 Saxophone – Vincent Henry (arrangements), Khari Allen Lee
 Clarinet – Vincent Henry
 Orchestra – Czech Film Orchestras
 Piano – Alex Bugnon, James Poyser, Daniel Crean (programming), Eren Cannata (programming)
 Trumpet – Emilio Lopez
 Flugelhorn – Emilio Lopez
 Keyboards – Oak Felder (programming)

Production 

 A&R – Rani Hancock, Joanna Terrasi (administration)
 Arranged By – Salaam Remi
 Music co-ordinator – Nik Boskoff
 Design – Stephen Walker (packaging)
 Executive producer – Aaron Bay-Schuck, Amanda Ghost, Lynn Fainchtein, PJ Bloom, Rani Hancock, Tom Corson
 Legal advisor – Jason R. Heller
 Management – Jeffrey Evans, Chris Atlas  (marketing), Shawnaé Corbett-Rice (marketing), Nacho Burgoa (music clearance)
 Mastered by – Chris Gehringer (tracks: 1, 2, 4 to 13), Dave Kutch (tracks: 3)
 Mixed by – Eric J. Dubowsky (tracks: 4, 6), Hotae Alexander Jang (tracks: 3), Jimmy Douglass (tracks: 1, 2, 5, 7 to 13), Salaam Remi (tracks: 1, 2, 5, 7 to 13), Matt Curtin (tracks: 4, 6; mixing assistance)
 Photography by – Philippe Bosse
 Producer – Andra Day (tracks: 3), Raphael Saadiq (tracks: 3), Salaam Remi (tracks: 1, 2, 5, 7 to 13), Warren Felder (tracks: 4, 6)
 Recorded by – Hotae Alexander Jang (tracks: 3), Ryan Evans (tracks: 1, 2, 5, 7 to 13), Downtown Trevor Brown (tracks: 4, 6), Warren Felder (tracks: 4, 6)
 Supervised by – Lynn Fainchtein

Recording 

 Recorded at – Bay Eight
 Mixed at – The Magic Mix Room
 Mixed at – Instrument Zoo
 Mastered at – Sterling Sound
 Mastered at – The Mastering Palace

Awards and nominations

References

External links 
 

2021 soundtrack albums
Billie Holiday
Grammy Award for Best Compilation Soundtrack for Visual Media
Grammy Award-winning albums
Albums produced by Raphael Saadiq
Albums produced by Salaam Remi
Albums produced by Oak Felder
Film scores
Soul soundtracks
Pop soundtracks
Contemporary classical music soundtracks
Western music (North America) albums
Warner Records soundtracks
Lakeshore Records soundtracks